Zhaneta Tosheva Ilieva (born 3 October 1984 in Veliko Tarnovo) is a retired Bulgarian rhythmic gymnast. She is a two-time member of the Bulgarian rhythmic gymnastics team at the World Championships, and contributed to a silver medal in the group all-around in 2003. The following year, at the 2004 Summer Olympics in Athens, Ilieva helped her squad claim a bronze medal in the same program before her official retirement from the sport.

Career

2000–2003
Ilieva made her senior official debut in 1999, and later competed as part of the Bulgarian women's rhythmic gymnastics team at the 2000 Summer Olympics in Sydney, where she placed seventh in the group all-around tournament with a composite score of 38.432 (19.166 for five clubs and 19.266 for two hoops and three ribbons).

At the 2002 World Rhythmic Gymnastics Championships in New Orleans, Louisiana, United States, Ilieva and her Bulgarian team finished fourth in the same program with a score in 47.050, missing out the medal podium by 350-thousandths of a point.

The following year, at the 2003 World Rhythmic Gymnastics Championships in Budapest, Hungary, Ilieva pulled off the second highest score both in ribbons and in hoops and clubs to hand the Bulgarians a silver medal in the group all-around tournament (a score of 50.175), and a qualifying ticket to her second Olympics.

2004 Summer Olympics

At the 2004 Summer Olympics in Athens, Ilieva competed for the Bulgarian women's rhythmic gymnastics team in the group all-around tournament, after receiving a qualifying berth from the World Championships. Teaming with  Eleonora Kezhova, Zornitsa Marinova, Kristina Rangelova, and twin sisters Galina and Vladislava Tancheva in the competition, Ilieva performed a double routine using five ribbons (23.400) and a combination of three hoops and two balls (25.200) to deliver the Bulgarian squad a bronze-medal score in 48.600.

Life after gymnastics
Shortly after the Olympics, Ilieva announced her retirement from rhythmic gymnastics to further pursue her degree in sports journalism at the National Sports Academy in Sofia, and later worked as a recreational and competitive team and individual coach for the Bulgarian team.

See also
 List of Olympic medalists in gymnastics (women)

References

External links
 
 
 
 
 

1984 births
Living people
Bulgarian rhythmic gymnasts
Gymnasts at the 2000 Summer Olympics
Gymnasts at the 2004 Summer Olympics
Medalists at the 2004 Summer Olympics
Olympic gymnasts of Bulgaria
Olympic bronze medalists for Bulgaria
Olympic medalists in gymnastics
People from Veliko Tarnovo
Gymnasts from Sofia
Medalists at the Rhythmic Gymnastics World Championships